My Little Girl is a 1986 American drama film the directorial debut of Connie Kaiserman that was released in the U.S. in 1987. It is also Geraldine Page's final role and both Jennifer Lopez and Erika Alexander's film debut.

Plot
Franny Bettinger has had a privileged and wealthy upbringing. One summer she takes a job at a halfway house where she finds herself personally affected by the people she meets. Despite facing hostility due to her background, Bettinger becomes determined to teach the youngsters that they are important and can succeed in life. Unfortunately, she faces opposition from her parents and from her supervisor.

Cast
Mary Stuart Masterson as Franny Bettinger
James Earl Jones as Mr. Bailey
Geraldine Page as Molly
Anne Meara as Mrs. Shopper
Pamela Payton-Wright as Delly Bettinger
Peter Michael Goetz as Norman Bettinger
Jennifer Lopez as Myra
Erika Alexander as Joan
Abeni Garrett as Ginger

Release
My Little Girl was released on DVD and Blu-ray.

Awards

References

External links

1986 drama films
American drama films
1986 directorial debut films
1980s English-language films
1980s American films